Mikkel Andersen (born 17 December 1988) is a Danish professional footballer who plays as a goalkeeper for Viborg FF in the Danish Superliga.

He has appeared in 17 European matches, amongst others against Rubin Kazan, Napoli, Club Brugge, Legia Warsaw, Manchester United, Slovan Bratislava and FC Krasnodar.

Club career

Denmark
Andersen began his career with Danish club AB and became the youngest goalkeeper to play in Danish senior football. He joined Reading on a two-and-a-half-year contract on 26 January 2007, having played seven times for AB.

Reading
Andersen signed a loan deal with Torquay United on 26 February 2008, making his debut the same day in a 1–1 draw at home to Altrincham.

He returned to Reading having played three times for Torquay during his one-month on loan and looked set to remain with Reading for the remainder of the season. However, he joined Rushden & Diamonds on a seven-day emergency loan on 15 April 2008, making his Rushden debut in a 2–1 win at home to Torquay. He also played in the defeats against Exeter City and Oxford United before returning to Reading.

In December 2008, he was again signed on an emergency loan, this time for Brentford, whose first-choice keeper Ben Hamer, also borrowed from Reading, was suspended. He was named MOTM and Team of the week for his performance in this one game.

On 6 March 2009, it was revealed that Andersen had joined League One side Brighton & Hove Albion on loan for one month.

On 20 September 2014, he made his full debut for the club in a 1-0 defeat away to Sheffield Wednesday.

Bristol Rovers (loan)
On 1 September 2009, deadline day, Andersen was signed on loan by Bristol Rovers until 1 January. He made his debut against Millwall which Bristol Rovers won 2–0, keeping a clean sheet.

On 20 March, Andersen played against two other on-loan Reading players Scott Davies and Alex McCarthy. He kept a clean sheet from that game which ended 3–0 to Bristol Rovers. On 5 April, he saved a penalty from Milton Keynes Dons' Jermaine Easter as Rovers won 1–0, keeping another clean sheet this penalty save was his first ever one.

Andersen played 58 League games for The Pirates. He was awarded the League One side's Young Player of the Year trophy, and was also ranked third in the overall Player of the Year poll. For his performances and awards he was named In The BBC Team of The Year as well.

Andersen finished his loan spell with Bristol Rovers on 5 January 2011.

Portsmouth (loan)
On 17 August, Andersen joined Portsmouth on loan for one month. He made his debut in an Npower League 1 game against Bournemouth, the game ended in a 1–1 draw.

Randers (loan)
On 11 June 2013, Andersen joined Danish Superliga side Randers on loan for the 2013–14 season. Andersen made his debut on 20 July 2013 against Viborg in a game that ended 2-2.

Midtjylland
On 25 June 2015, Andersen signed a two-year contract with FC Midtjylland. Andersen played all six matches in the Europa League group stage against Club Brugge, Legia Warsaw and Napoli, where FC Midtjylland finished as runners-up to qualify for the final rounds. In February 2016, Midtjylland and Andersen beat Manchester United 2–1 at MCH Arena and lost 1–5 at Old Trafford in the second leg of round of 32. In those two matches, Andersen saved a penalty from Juan Mata, and his general performances were generally lauded. In the same 2015–16 season, Andersen kept an average score of under one goal against in the Superliga, where Midtjylland finished third in the league and won bronze medals.

Andersen left the club in the summer of 2017.

Lyngby BK
Andersen signed a three-year contract with Lyngby Boldklub on 24 June 2017.

SK Brann
Andersen joined the Norwegian Eliteserien club SK Brann, in June 2021, but terminated his contract 20 August the same year, after a scandal involving him and other players partying at Brann Stadion.

Viborg
On 31 August 2021, Andersen joined newly promoted Danish Superliga club Viborg FF on a deal until June 2023.

International career
After signing for Reading, Andersen played three games for the Danish national under-19 and under-20 teams during 2007. He made his debut for the Denmark national under-21 football team in February 2009, replacing Jonas Lössl at half-time. In May 2010, he joined the under-21 team for a series of unofficial games at the international 2010 Toulon Tournament. He made four appearances as Denmark finished runners-up, and was named goalkeeper of the tournament.

He has played 14 games for the Denmark national under-21 football team. In the other 10 under-21 games, three of them were at the 2011 UEFA European Under-21 Championship.

Career statistics

Honours
Individual
Toulon Tournament Best Goalkeeper: 2010

References

External links
 
 Denmark national team profile
 Complete League statistics at danskfodbold.com 
 

1988 births
Living people
Footballers from Copenhagen
People from Herlev Municipality
Danish men's footballers
Denmark under-21 international footballers
Denmark youth international footballers
Danish expatriate men's footballers
Association football goalkeepers
Reading F.C. players
Torquay United F.C. players
Rushden & Diamonds F.C. players
Brentford F.C. players
Brighton & Hove Albion F.C. players
Bristol Rovers F.C. players
Portsmouth F.C. players
Randers FC players
FC Midtjylland players
SK Brann players
Viborg FF players
National League (English football) players
English Football League players
Danish Superliga players
Danish expatriate sportspeople in England
Danish expatriate sportspeople in Norway
Expatriate footballers in England
Expatriate footballers in Norway